Soulforce is an American LGBT-issue-focused social justice and civil rights organization.

Soulforce, soul-force or soul force may also refer to:

 Soulforce Revolution, a 1989 release of the punk band 7 Seconds
 Soul-force, a component of Satyagraha, a philosophy and practice of nonviolent resistance

See also
 Life force (disambiguation)